José Francisco Canales García (born 4 May 1987) is a former football goalkeeper.

Club career
After several seasons as a back-up goalkeeper, Canales earned the starting role following a serious injury to Pedro Hernández during the Clausura 2009.

On 18 July 2020, Canales joined Atlético Ensenada from the Liga de Balompié Mexicano.

References

External links
 

1987 births
Living people
Footballers from Guadalajara, Jalisco
Association football goalkeepers
Mexican footballers
Atlas F.C. footballers
Leones Negros UdeG footballers
Lobos BUAP footballers